Acrocercops defigurata is a moth of the family Gracillariidae, known from Assam, India, as well as Nepal. It was described by Edward Meyrick in 1928. The hostplant for the species is Juglans regia.

References

defigurata
Moths of Asia
Moths described in 1928